Carl Raddatz (13 March 1912 – 19 May 2004) was a German stage and film actor. Raddatz was a leading man of German cinema during the Nazi era appearing in a number of propaganda films and romances. Later in his career he developed a reputation for playing benevolent father figures.

Raddatz was briefly married to actress Hannelore Schroth, but the union ended in divorce.

Partial filmography

 Urlaub auf Ehrenwort (1938) - Grenadier Dr.Jens Kirchhoff
 Faded Melody (1938) - Werner Gront
 Liebelei und Liebe (1938) - Günther Windgassen
 Silvesternacht am Alexanderplatz (1939) - Reinhardt
 Twelve Minutes After Midnight (1939) - Juwelenmakler Griffin
 Liberated Hands (1939) - Graf Joachim von Erken
 We Danced Around the World (1939) - Harvey Swington
 Twilight (1940) - Robert Thiele
 Golowin geht durch die Stadt (1940) - Dr. Robert Cannenburgh
 Wunschkonzert (1940) - Herbert Koch
 Above All Else in the World (1941) - Carl Wiegand
 Stukas (1941) - Hauptmann Heinz Bork
 Heimkehr (1941) - Dr. Fritz Mutius
 5 June (1942) - Feldwebel Richard Schulz
 Immensee (1943) - Reinhart Torsten
 A Wife for Three Days (1944) - Hanns Jennerberg
 Opfergang (1944) - Albrecht Froben
 Das war mein Leben (1944) - Dr. Ophoven
 Die Schenke zur ewigen Liebe (1945) - Mathias Bentrup
 Under the Bridges (1946) - Hendrik Feldkamp
 Zugvögel (1947) - Georg
 In Those Days (1947) - Josef / 7. Geschichte
 And If We Should Meet Again (1947) - Narrator
 Where the Trains Go (1949) - Max Engler
 Shadows in the Night (1950) - Richard Struwe
 Gabriela (1950) - Charlie Braatz
  (1950) - Christoph Monitor / Robb
 The Orplid Mystery (1950) - Pianist Aldo Siano
 Taxi-Kitty (1950) - Charly
 Poison in the Zoo (1952) - Dr. Martin Rettberg
 Towers of Silence (1952) - Robert Morrison
 Beloved Life (1953) - Carl von Bolin
 Regina Amstetten (1954) - Von freyberg
 Confession Under Four Eyes (1954) - Dr. Frigge
 Oasis (1955) - Antoine
 Roses in Autumn (1955) - Major von Crampas
 Night of Decision (1956) - René Dobersin
  (1956) - Archibald 'Archi' von Barring
 Das Mädchen Marion (1956) - Dr. Meining, Tierarzt
  (1957) - Professor Ernst Abbe
 Rosemary (1958) - Hartog
 Jons und Erdme (1959) - Jons Baltruschowsky
 The Counterfeit Traitor (1962) - Otto Holtz
 Everyone Dies Alone (1976) - Otto Quangel
 The Buddenbrooks (1979, TV Series) - Johann Buddenbrook sen.

References

Bibliography

External links

1912 births
2004 deaths
Actors from Mannheim
People from the Grand Duchy of Baden
German male film actors
German male stage actors
Officers Crosses of the Order of Merit of the Federal Republic of Germany